The Journal of Environmental Science and Health, Part C: Environmental Carcinogenesis and Ecotoxicology Reviews is a biannual peer-reviewed scientific journal covering environmental health as it relates to carcinogenesis and toxicology. It was established in 1976 and is published by Taylor & Francis. The editor-in-chief is Peter P. Fu (National Center for Toxicological Research). According to the Journal Citation Reports, the journal has a 2015 impact factor of 3.667.

References

External links

Taylor & Francis academic journals
Biannual journals
Publications established in 1976
Environmental health journals
Oncology journals
Toxicology journals
English-language journals